Vern Oliver Knudsen (December 27, 1893 – May 13, 1974) was an American acoustical physicist.

Biography
Knudsen received his bachelor's degree from Brigham Young University (BYU) with an A.B. in 1915.  Following his graduation from BYU Knudsen served a mission for the Church of Jesus Christ of Latter-day Saints from 1915-1918 in the Northern States Mission, which was headquartered in Chicago.   Knudsen then joined the staff of Bell Laboratories where he worked with Harvey Fletcher, who had been one of his professors at BYU.

He received his Ph.D. in physics from the University of Chicago in 1922. Vern Knudsen's publications include two seminal books, "Architectural Acoustics," published in 1932, and "Acoustical Designing in Architecture" with Cyril M. Harris, 1950.

He co-founded the Acoustical Society of America (ASA), and served as its president, 1933–35, and the ASA awarded him the Wallace Clement Sabine Medal in 1958 and the Gold Medal in 1967. He was the recipient of the John H. Potts (Gold) Medal from the Audio Engineering Society (AES) in 1964.

In 1934, Vern Knudsen was made Dean of the Graduate Division of the Southern Section of the University of California, a post which he held for 24 years and during which time the UCLA Graduate Division increased from 287 to 5160. He served as Chancellor of UCLA from 1959 to 1960, where there is a building named in his honor. Knudsen was the director of the University of California Division of War Research during World War II, he helped improve sonar.

References

External links
Archival materials relating to Vern Oliver Knudsen in the L. Tom Perry Special Collections, Harold B. Lee Library, Brigham Young University

1893 births
1974 deaths
20th-century American physicists
American acoustical engineers
Engineers from California
American Mormon missionaries in the United States
Brigham Young University alumni
University of Chicago alumni
Leaders of the University of California, Los Angeles
Fellows of the American Physical Society
Acoustical Society of America
20th-century Mormon missionaries
Latter Day Saints from Utah
ASA Gold Medal recipients
Latter Day Saints from New Jersey
Latter Day Saints from Illinois
Latter Day Saints from California